Mowr Deraz (also Romanized as Mowr Derāz) is a village in Kavar Rural District, in the Central District of Kavar County, Fars Province, Iran. At the 2006 census, its population was 126, in 26 families.

References 

Populated places in Kavar County